L'arte del violino is a noteworthy and influential musical composition by Italian Baroque violinist and composer Pietro Locatelli. The twelve concerti were written for solo violin, strings, and basso continuo and were published in 1733 as the composer's third opus. The virtuosic style and artistry present in the work strongly influenced violin playing in the 18th century and cemented Locatelli's reputation as a pioneer of modern violin technique.

Compositional History

L'arte del violino was first published by the publishing house of Roger-Le Cene in the city of Amsterdam, where Locatelli resided from the year 1729 until his death in 1764. It is dedicated to the Venetian patriarch Girolamo Michiel Lini, for whom he had performed while staying in Venice and of whose orchestra Locatelli remarked upon the skill and "unparalleled size."

Structure

As opposed to his previous music, which models itself on the Roman style of baroque composition best exemplified by Arcangelo Corelli, the concerti of L'arte del violino were created in the newer Venetian style of Antonio Vivaldi. The music makes ample use of the violin's very high register, giving it a bel canto quality lacking in Locatelli's early work.

Each of the twelve concertos in L'arte del violino contained the traditional three movements, with the typical progression of two faster movements surrounding a slower, more contemplative middle movement. In each concerto, the two outer movements contain what is known as a capriccio. These capricci, often lasting several minutes, can be described as a kind of written-out violin cadenza played extemporaneously during which the soloist is given ample opportunity to display his or her skill with the instrument. The capricci intervals contradict the expected format of the solo concerto by occurring before the final ritornello of the tutti. It is these 24 extraordinary capricci intervals for which L'arte del violino attained its fame, for they are described as "the most difficult violin display passages of all Baroque literature."

The final concerto of the twelve, nicknamed the "Labyrinth" concerto by the composer, is notorious for its exceedingly difficult capricci. Locatelli wrote the following inscription beneath the first-movement capriccio: "Laberinto armonico: 'Facilis aditus; difficilis exitus.'" This can be translated to mean, "Harmonic Labyrinth: Easy to enter; difficult to escape!"

In a letter dated April 11, 1741, Benjamin Tate, an English visitor, expressed his astonishment after listening to Locatelli play from the Labyrinth Concerto:

Outline of concertos and movements
Concerto No. 1 in D major, Op. 3/1
 Allegro
 Largo
 Allegro
Concerto No. 2 in C minor, Op. 3/2
 Andante
 Largo
 Andante
Concerto No. 3 in F major, Op. 3/3
 Andante
 Largo
 Vivace
Concerto No. 4 in E major, Op. 3/4
 Largo – Andante
 Largo
 Andante
Concerto No. 5 in C major, Op. 3/5
 Largo
 Adagio
 Allegro
Concerto No. 6 in G minor, Op. 3/6
 Largo – Andante
 Adagio
 Vivace
Concerto No. 7 in B flat major, Op. 3/7
 Andante
 Largo
 Allegro
Concerto No. 8 in E minor, Op. 3/8
 Andante
 Largo
 Allegro
Concerto No. 9 in G major, Op. 3/9
 Allegro
 Largo
 Allegro
Concerto No. 10 in F major, Op. 3/10
 Allegro
 Largo – Andante
 Andante
Concerto No. 11 in A major, Op. 3/11
 Allegro
 Largo
 Andante
Concerto No. 12 in D major: Il Laberinto Armonico, facilus aditus, difficilis exitus, Op. 3/12
 Allegro
 Largo
 Allegro

References

External links 
 Full free score for violin solo part of L'arte del violino

1733 compositions
Compositions by Pietro Locatelli